TVR Iași is one of the six regional stations of TVR - the Romanian National Television Station. Its headquarters are in Iași. TVR Iași programmes are broadcast in the Moldova Region of Romania, covering all eight departments in the north-eastern part of the country. The station broadcasts daily and produces programmes for the national (TVR 1, TVR2, TVR3, TVR HD, TVR International, TVR Moldova) and international Romanian public channels. Its first broadcast was on 3 November 1991.

In 1992, the station joined CIRCOM Regional, the European Association of Regional Television Stations.

References

External links
Televiziunea Română - Studioul TVR Iași
Televiziunea Română

1991 establishments in Romania
Iasi
Mass media in Iași
Television channels and stations established in 1991
Television stations in Romania